is a 2011 Japanese television drama series that is produced by Sony and Fuji Television. It is the first television series in 3D made in Japan.This television series revolves around air traffic control, and it stars Ayako Kawahara and Saburō Tokitō as air traffic controllers.

Tokyo Control premiered on Sky PerfecTV! HD, a subscription-based channel on the Fuji Television network, on January 19, 2012. It was aired in both 2D and 3D formats, and it has a total of 10 episodes. This television series has been well received by viewers.

Cast
 Ayako Kawahara as Maki Suzuki, one of the chief air-traffic controllers
 Saburō Tokitō as Noboru Yuki, a chief air-traffic controller
 Misa Shimizu as Kimie Saitou, a daytime air-traffic controller
 Zen Kajihara as Motoharu Yano, a chief air-traffic controller
 Maho Nonami as Haru Nakajima, an air-traffic controller with 3 years of experience
 Takuma Oto as Kouji Hara, one of the chief air-traffic controllers
 Rome Kanda as Keichi Ota, a chief air-traffic controller
 Yosuke Kawamura as Makoto Yamada, a trainee air-traffic controller
 Masanobu Sakata as Tetsushi Shimoyanagi, one of the chief air-traffic controllers
 Toru Nomaguchi as Takashi Shikishima, an air-traffic controller with 5 years of experience and loves coffee
 Takashi Ito as Kazuma Kinoshita, a drillmaster
 Yuji Sugao as Takeshi Matsumoto, an air-traffic controller with 5 years of experience
 Narumi Konno as Narumi Kawamoto, an air-traffic controller with 2 years of experience
 Naoto Kinosaki as Kodai Takahashi, an air-traffic technician
 Takehiko Ono Hiroshi Yokoyama, an air-traffic technician, but retires and works for a coffee shop

Production
The production team had consulted with the production staff of the film Avatar before the production of this television series.

Reception
Rick Martin described this series as "Surprisingly good" and that it "was smartly photographed to take full advantage of the 3-D platform". He also praised its filming technique, saying that its "camera movements are slow and subtle enough so as not to be distracting, but they're significant enough to continually create noticeable changes in perspective."

The producer of this television series said that of the emails that the production crew have received, "nearly all [were] positive". He added that most "viewers find the stories interesting."

References

External links
  
 

2011 Japanese television series debuts
2011 Japanese television series endings
3D television shows
Television shows set in Saitama Prefecture